Calorophus is a group of plants in the Restionaceae described as a genus in 1806. The entire genus is endemic to Australia, found in the States of Victoria and Tasmania.

 Species
 Calorophus elongatus Labill. - Victoria and Tasmania
 Calorophus erostris (C.B.Clarke) L.A.S.Johnson & B.G.Briggs - Tasmania

References

Restionaceae
Poales genera
Endemic flora of Australia
Poales of Australia
Taxa named by Jacques Labillardière